Malta (MLT) competed at the 2005 Mediterranean Games in Almería, Spain. The island had a total number of 29 participants (26 men and 3 women).

Medals

Bronze
 Shooting
Men's Double Trap: William Chetcuti

Athletes

Athletics
Carol Galea
Jeandre Mallia
Rashid Chouhal
Mario Bonello
Darren Gilford

Football
Andrei Agius
Edmund Agius
Matthew Bartolo
Steven Bezzina
David Camenzuli
Dyson Falzon
Clayton Failla
Paul Fenech
Kenneth Spiteri
Andrew Hogg
Joseph Mifsud
Alex Muscat
Bernard Paris
Jonathan Pearson
Joel Sammut Vasquez
Ryan Fenech
Mark Gauci
Andrew Scerri

Golf
Andrew Borg

Judo
Marcon Bezzina

Shooting
William Chetcuti
Emmanuel Grima

Swimming
Angela Galea

Wrestling
Abraham Vassallo

See also
 Malta at the 2004 Summer Olympics
 Malta at the 2008 Summer Olympics

References
 Official Site
 nocmalta

Nations at the 2005 Mediterranean Games
2005
Mediterranean Games